Zoubir Ouasti (born 28 February 1981 in Oran, Algeria) is an Algerian former international football player.

Club career
 2000-2005 MC Oran 
 2005-2007 CR Belouizdad 
 2007-2008 USM Annaba 
 2008-2011 MC Oran 
 2011-2012 ASM Oran 
 2012-2013. MC Oran 
 2013-2014. RC Relizane 
 2014-2015. MC Oran

Honours
 Runner-up of the Arab Champions League once with MC Oran in 2001
 Runner-up of the Algerian Cup once with MC Oran in 2002
 Has 1 cap for the Algerian National Team

References

External links

1981 births
Algerian footballers
Algeria international footballers
Living people
Footballers from Oran
MC Oran players
USM Annaba players
Algerian Ligue Professionnelle 1 players
Algeria under-23 international footballers
Algeria youth international footballers
RC Relizane players
Competitors at the 2001 Mediterranean Games
Association football defenders
Mediterranean Games competitors for Algeria
21st-century Algerian people